Phulad is a village located in Marwar Junction tehsil of Pali district in Rajasthan state of India. Aravalli Range is nearby to the village. There is a railway station on Marwar Junction-Udaipur line. There is also a dam by the same name built in 1972.

Demographics

The population of Phulad is 939 according to the 2001 Census. The population in 2010 was 2500.

References
 History of Bagol Station on Phulad-Udaipur Railway 
  Phulad Village population

Villages in Pali district